Karel Kachyňa (1 May 1924 – 12 March 2004) was a Czech film director and screenwriter. His career spanned over five decades.

Early life
He was born on May 1, 1920, in Vyškov, Czechoslovakia. His father was a government officer. His mother was an art teacher. After spending first 4 years of his life in Vyškov, he moved with his family to Dačice and then Kroměříž. Kachyňa studied at Baťa School of Art in Zlín. During the WWII he was forced to work in a German factory Walter Georgi in Bernsbach. After the war he was able to finish high school and work on commercials at the Baťa film studios in Zlín. Kachyňa was then accepted at newly founded Film and TV School of the Academy of Performing Arts in Prague (FAMU) to study cinematography and directing. His fellow students were Vojtěch Jasný, Zdeněk Podskalský and Antonín Kachlík.

Career
After the graduation he directed socialist realist propaganda documentaries with Jasný. Throughout the 1950s they both worked for the Czechoslovak Army Film. In the 1952 they traveled to China with Art Ensemble of the Czechoslovak People's Army and made three documentaries about the country. 

Kachyňa made his most celebrated movies with a screenwriter Jan Procházka in relatively free period in the 1960s.

After the Warsaw Pact invasion of Czechoslovakia and in subsequent Normalization period, his politically critical movies Long Live the Republic!, Coach to Vienna, The Nun's Night and The Ear were banned. Kachyňa was fired from his teaching job at FAMU, after the film Uninvited Guest by his student Vlastimil Venclík was interpreted as being a criticism of the Soviet Invasion. From the 1970s he directed mostly historical movies focused on the lives of regular people, and children movies. After the Velvet Revolution he was re-hired at FAMU and continued to teach there until his retirement.

Personal life
Kachyňa was married twice. He had one daughter, Eliška, with his first wife Eliška Kuchařová. He met his second wife Alena Mihulová during the filming of Sestřičky in 1983. Their daughter, Karolína, was born in 1994. He lived in the 16th century house in Nový svět neighbourhood near Czernin Palace at Hradčany, Prague.

Filmography

Feature films

Television
 Cesta byla suchá, místy mokrá (2003)
 Kožené slunce (2002)
 Otec neznámý aneb cesta do hlubin duše výstrojního náčelníka (2001)
 Three Kings (1998) TV series
 Prima sezóna (1994) TV series
 Městem chodí Mikuláš (1992)
 Vlak dětství a naděje (1989) TV series
 Duhová kulička (1985)
 Velký případ malého detektiva a policejního psa Kykyna (1982)
 Počítání oveček (1981)
 Zlatí úhoři (1979)

Documentaries
 Bratři (1975)
 Legenda (1973)
 Four Times About Bulgaria (1958)
 The City Has Its Own Face (1958)
 World Championship of Air Models (1957)
 Crooked Mirror (1956)
 Stará čínská opera (1953)
 Z čínského zápisníku (1953)
 Lidé jednoho srdce (1953)
 Neobyčejná léta (1952)
 They Know What to Do (1950)
 Za život radostný (1950)
 Není stále zamračeno (1949)

References

Bibliography

External links
 

1924 births
2004 deaths
People from Vyškov
Czech film directors
Czechoslovak film directors
Czech screenwriters
Male screenwriters
Czechoslovak communists
Recipients of Medal of Merit (Czech Republic)
Academic staff of the Academy of Fine Arts, Prague